Centre Rawdon   is a community in the Canadian province of Nova Scotia, located in the Municipal District of East Hants. Abraham Cunard, the Loyalist merchant and father of shipping magnate Samuel Cunard, retired to the Cunards' country home in Rawdon. He is buried at the St. Paul's graveyard in Centre Rawdon.

See Upper Rawdon, Nova Scotia for history of the Township of Rawdon.

References

Centre Rawdon on Destination Nova Scotia

Communities in Hants County, Nova Scotia
General Service Areas in Nova Scotia